The Sealdah-Puri Duronto Express is a Superfast Express express train of the Duronto Express category belonging to Indian Railways - Eastern Railway zone that runs between Sealdah and Puri in India.

It operates as train number 22201 from Sealdah to Puri and as train number 22202 in the reverse direction serving the states of West Bengal & Odisha.

Coaches
The 22201 / 02 Sealdah Puri Duronto Express presently has 1 AC First Class, 1 AC 2 tier,  4 AC 3 tier, 8 Sleeper Class & 2 SLR (Seating cum Luggage Rake) coaches. It carries a Pantry car coach.

As is customary with most train services in India, Coach Composition may be amended at the discretion of Indian Railways depending on demand.

Service
The 22201 Sealdah Puri Duronto Express covers the distance of 522 kilometres in 08 hours 00 mins (65.25 km/hr) & in 08 hours 15 mins as 22202 Puri Sealdah Duronto Express (63.27 km/hr).

As the average speed of the train is above , as per Indian Railways rules, its fare includes a superfast surcharge.

References

External links

Transport in Kolkata
Transport in Puri
Duronto Express trains
Rail transport in West Bengal
Rail transport in Odisha
Railway services introduced in 2012